Basketball at the 2013 Games of the Small States of Europe was held at D'Coque in Luxembourg, from 28 May to 1 June 2013.

Medal summary

Medal table

Men's tournament

Table

|}

Results

Women's tournament

Table

|}

Results

External links
 2013 GSSE Official Website 
 Result book

Small Nations
2013 Games of the Small States of Europe
2013
Basketball in Luxembourg